Golden apple is a story element in various ancient mythologies.
Apple of Discord

Golden Apple may also refer to:

Fruit
Spondias mombin, a fruit also sometimes referred to as the golden apple
Golden Delicious, an apple cultivar
Quince, a fruit also known as golden apple
Spondias dulcis, a tropical fruit tree, also known as golden apple
Aegle marmelos, a tropical fruit tree, also known as golden apple
Tomato, a fruit, also known as golden apple in Italian, Russian and other languages

Media
The Golden Apple (musical), a 1954 musical based on parts of the Odyssey and the Iliad
The Golden Apple, middle part of The Illuminatus Trilogy novel series by Robert J. Shea and Robert A. Wilson
Golden Apple Award, an American award for entertainers
Golden Apple (TV series), a South Korean television drama series

Other
Golden Apple Award (education), a teaching award presented by various schools
Golden Apple Comics, a California-based chain of comic book store
Ampullariidae, a type of snail, also known as golden apple snail
Nickname of Westchester, New York
Common name of the lily Lilium carniolicum